Spider-Man is a 2002 American superhero film based on the Marvel Comics superhero of the same name. Directed by Sam Raimi from a screenplay by David Koepp, it is the first installment in Raimi's Spider-Man trilogy, and stars Tobey Maguire as the titular character, alongside Willem Dafoe, Kirsten Dunst, James Franco, Cliff Robertson, and Rosemary Harris. The film chronicles Spider-Man's origin story and early superhero career. After being bitten by a genetically-altered spider, outcast teenager Peter Parker develops spider-like superhuman abilities and adopts a masked superhero identity to fight crime and injustice in New York City, facing the sinister Green Goblin (Dafoe) in the process.

Development on a live-action Spider-Man film began in the 1980s. Filmmakers Tobe Hooper, James Cameron, and Joseph Zito were all attached to direct the film at one point. However, the project would languish in development hell due to licensing and financial issues. After progress on the film stalled for nearly 25 years, it was licensed for a worldwide release by Columbia Pictures in 1999 after it acquired options from Metro-Goldwyn-Mayer (MGM) on all previous scripts developed by Cannon Films, Carolco, and New Cannon. Exercising its option on just two elements from the multi-script acquisition (a different screenplay was written by James Cameron, Ted Newsom, John Brancato, Barney Cohen, and Joseph Goldman), Sony hired Koepp to create a working screenplay (credited as Cameron's), and Koepp received sole credit in final billing. Directors Roland Emmerich, Ang Lee, Chris Columbus, Barry Sonnenfeld, Tim Burton, Michael Bay, Jan de Bont, M. Night Shyamalan, Tony Scott, and David Fincher were considered to direct the project before Raimi was hired as director in 2000. The Koepp script was rewritten by Scott Rosenberg during pre-production and received a dialogue polish from Alvin Sargent during production. Filming took place in Los Angeles and New York City from January to June 2001. Sony Pictures Imageworks handled the film's visual effects.

Spider-Man premiered at the Mann Village Theater on April 29, 2002, and was released in the United States on May 3. The film received positive reviews from audiences and critics who praised Raimi's direction, the story, the performances, visual effects, action sequences, and musical score. It was the first film to reach $100 million in a single weekend as well as the most successful film based on a comic book at the time. With a box office gross of over $825 million worldwide, it was the third highest-grossing film of 2002 (after Harry Potter and the Chamber of Secrets and The Lord of the Rings: The Two Towers), the highest-grossing superhero film (surpassing Batman) and the sixth highest-grossing film overall at the time of its release. Spider-Man is credited for redefining the modern superhero genre, as well as the summer blockbuster. After its success, the film spawned two sequels, Spider-Man 2 and Spider-Man 3, released in 2004 and 2007 respectively. Maguire and Dafoe later reprised their roles in the Marvel Cinematic Universe (MCU) film Spider-Man: No Way Home (2021), which dealt with the concept of the multiverse and linked the Raimi trilogy to the MCU.

Plot

On a school trip, high-school senior Peter Parker visits a Columbia University genetics laboratory with his friend Harry Osborn and his love interest Mary Jane Watson. There, a genetically engineered "super-spider" bites him, and he falls ill upon returning home. Meanwhile, Harry's father Norman Osborn, a scientist and the founder and owner of Oscorp, tries to secure an important military contract. He experiments on himself with an unstable performance-enhancing chemical and goes insane, killing his assistant.

The next day, Peter finds he is no longer near-sighted and has developed spider-like abilities: he can shoot webs out of his wrists and has quick reflexes, superhuman speed and strength, and a heightened ability to sense danger. Brushing off his Uncle Ben's advice that "with great power comes great responsibility", Peter considers buying a car to impress Mary Jane. He enters an underground wrestling event to win the money for it and wins his first match, but the promoter cheats him out of his earnings. When a thief robs the promoter's office, Peter allows him to escape. Moments later, he discovers Ben was carjacked and killed. Peter pursues the carjacker, only to find out it was the thief he let escape. The thief attempts to flee but dies after falling out a window. Meanwhile, a crazed Norman interrupts a product test by Oscorp's rival Quest Aerospace and kills several people.

Upon graduating, Peter begins using his abilities to fight injustice, donning a spandex costume and the masked persona of Spider-Man. J. Jonah Jameson, publisher of the Daily Bugle newspaper, hires Peter as a freelance photographer, since he is the only person providing clear images of Spider-Man. Upon discovering that Oscorp's board plans to oust him to sell the company to Quest, Norman assassinates them. Jameson dubs the mysterious killer the "Green Goblin."

The Goblin offers Peter a place at his side, but he refuses. They fight, and Peter is wounded. At Thanksgiving dinner, Peter's Aunt May invites Mary Jane, Harry, and Norman. During the dinner, Norman sees the wound and realizes Peter's identity. Thinking the only way to defeat Peter is to attack those special to him, Norman later attacks May, forcing her to be hospitalized. While visiting Aunt May at the hospital, Mary Jane admits her infatuation with Spider-Man, who has rescued her on two occasions. Harry, who is dating Mary Jane, sees her holding Peter's hand and assumes she has feelings for him. Devastated, Harry tells his father that Peter loves Mary Jane, unknowingly revealing Spider-Man's biggest weakness. 

Norman holds Mary Jane and a Roosevelt Island Tram car full of children hostage alongside the Queensboro Bridge. He forces Peter to choose whom he wants to save and drops them both. Peter saves both Mary Jane and the tram car. Norman then throws him into a nearby abandoned building and brutally beats him. Peter gains the upper hand, and Norman reveals himself and begs for forgiveness while subtly getting his glider ready to impale Peter from behind. Warned by his spider-sense, Peter dodges the attack, and the glider impales Norman instead. Norman tells Peter not to reveal his identity as the Goblin to Harry before dying. Peter takes Norman's body to the Osborn house and is confronted by Harry, who pulls a gun on him, but Peter escapes.

At Norman's funeral, Harry swears vengeance on Spider-Man, whom he holds responsible for his father's death. Mary Jane confesses to Peter that she loves him. Peter, however, feels he must protect her from the unwanted attention of his enemies, so he hides his true feelings and tells Mary Jane that they can only be friends. As Peter leaves, he recalls Ben's words and accepts his new responsibility as Spider-Man.

Cast

Tobey Maguire as Peter Parker / Spider-Man:An academically-gifted high school student who is socially inept. After a genetically engineered spider bites him, he gains spider-like powers, including super-strength, enhanced reflexes, a "spider sense" that warns him of incoming danger, and the ability to climb walls and shoot spiderwebs (in a departure from the comics, where he utilizes web-shooters). Following a personal tragedy, he decides to use his newfound powers for good, and begins fighting crime and injustice as Spider-Man.
Willem Dafoe as Norman Osborn / Green Goblin:A scientist and the CEO of Oscorp who tests an unstable strength enhancer on himself and develops a crazed alternate personality. He later becomes a costumed villain using advanced Oscorp armor and equipment, such as a weaponized glider and pumpkin-shaped explosives; the media dubs his alter-ego the "Green Goblin". Norman develops animosity for Spider-Man after the hero refuses to join him, and makes constant attempts to get back at him. Ironically, he quickly takes a liking to Peter, and sees himself as a father figure for the boy, while ignoring his own son, Harry.
Kirsten Dunst as Mary Jane "MJ" Watson:Peter's love interest ever since he was six years old. Mary Jane has an abusive father, and aspires to become an actress, but gets a job as a waitress at a run down diner, a fact she hides from her boyfriend Harry. She later develops feelings for Peter as they spend more time together, and for his alter-ego, after he saves her on multiple occasions.
James Franco as Harry Osborn: Peter's best friend and flatmate, Mary Jane's boyfriend and Norman's son who is envious of his father's apparent closeness with Peter. Before being cast as Harry, Franco had screen tested for Spider-Man himself.
Cliff Robertson as Ben Parker: May Parker's husband and Peter's uncle, a laid off electrician who is trying to find a new job. He is killed by a carjacker whom Peter had earlier refused to stop, and leaves Peter with the message, "With great power comes great responsibility."
Rosemary Harris as May Parker: Ben Parker's wife and Peter's aunt.

J. K. Simmons portrays J. Jonah Jameson, the grouchy publisher of the Daily Bugle newspaper who considers Spider-Man a criminal. Ron Perkins portrays Mendel Stromm, Osborn's head scientist, while Gerry Becker and Jack Betts play board members Maximillian Fargas and Henry Balkan. Stanley Anderson plays General Slocum and Jim Ward plays the Project Coordinator. John Paxton portrays Bernard Houseman, the butler to the Osborn family. Joe Manganiello portrays Parker's bully and rival Flash Thompson, while Sally Livingstone portrays Liz Allan. Jason Padgett portrays Flash's Crony. Bill Nunn, Ted Raimi and Elizabeth Banks portray Daily Bugle editor Robbie Robertson, Daily Bugle employees Ted Hoffman, and Jameson's secretary Betty Brant, respectively. Michael Papajohn appears as "The Carjacker", the robber who kills Ben Parker. Bruce Campbell, a long-time colleague of director Sam Raimi, cameoed as the announcer at the wrestling ring Parker takes part in. Raimi himself appeared off-screen, throwing popcorn at Parker as he enters the arena to wrestle Bonesaw McGraw (played by former professional wrestler "Macho Man" Randy Savage), while Jack Murdock (played by former professional wrestler Scott L. Schwartz) is carried off on a stretcher. Spider-Man co-creator Stan Lee briefly appears in the film to grab a young girl from falling debris during the battle between Spider-Man and the Green Goblin at the World Unity Fair in Times Square. Raimi originally thought Stan Lee doing a cameo in the film was a bad idea.

Octavia Spencer appears as a staff member at Parker's wrestling match. Tig Notaro was offered the role by Raimi and auditioned, but lost it to Spencer. R&B/soul singer Macy Gray appears as herself performing at the World Unity Fair. Lucy Lawless also appears as a punk rock girl who says "Guy with eight hands... sounds hot." She did the appearance as a favor to her husband, Xena: Warrior Princess creator Rob Tapert, on which Raimi had served as an executive producer alongside Tapert. One of the stunt performers in this film is actor Johnny Tri Nguyen. Kickboxer Benny "The Jet" Urquidez has an uncredited cameo as a mugger who attacks Mary Jane. Comedian Jim Norton shows up in one scene as a truck driver who has an unfavorable opinion of Spider-Man. R.C. Everbeck was intended to play Eddie Brock, but his scenes were unreleased; Brock eventually appeared in Spider-Man 3, portrayed by Topher Grace. Sara Ramirez appears as a police officer at Uncle Ben's death scene. K. K. Dodds plays Simkins, Scott Spiegel plays a Marine Cop, while Larry Joshua plays a promoter who cheats Parker out of his winnings. Hugh Jackman, who played Logan / Wolverine in Fox's X-Men film series was planned to have a cameo appearance as the character, with Jackman even arriving in New York to shoot the scene, only for it to be scrapped after the production team realized they did not have the character's suit.

Production

Development

In the early 1980s, Marvel Comics was in negotiations with film producers to bring their flagship character Spider-Man to the big screen. Producer Roger Corman was the first to hold an option on the Spider-Man property and began to develop the film at Orion Pictures. Spider-Man co-creator Stan Lee was brought on to write a screenplay which featured Cold War themes and Doctor Octopus as the primary antagonist. The project did not come into fruition following budgetary disputes between Corman and Lee. The film rights were then acquired by Menahem Golan and Yoram Globus of The Cannon Group for $225,000 in 1985. The two were not familiar with the character's background and mistook Spider-Man for being similar to a werewolf-like character. Leslie Stevens, creator of The Outer Limits, was hired to write a screenplay based on this concept. Stevens' script featured Peter Parker as an ID-badge photographer who becomes subject to a mad scientist's experiment which transforms him into a human tarantula. Tobe Hooper, who was preparing to shoot The Texas Chainsaw Massacre 2 and Invaders from Mars for Cannon, signed on to direct. Stan Lee hated the horror route the studio was taking with the character and demanded that a new script be written that was closer to the source material.

By 1985, a new script was being written by Ted Newsom and John Brancato. In this version, Peter Parker receives his spider-like abilities from a cyclotron experiment. Doctor Octopus served as the antagonist and was written as Parker's mentor turned enemy. Barney Cohen was brought in to do a rewrite which added humor, additional action scenes, and a supporting villain. Newsom and Brancato had John Cusack in mind for the part of Peter Parker. Cannon hired Joseph Zito to direct the film having previously directed the commercially successful Invasion U.S.A. for the studio. For the role of Peter Parker/Spider-Man, the studio considered Tom Cruise while Zito was interested in casting actor and stuntman Scott Leva who had previously done promotional appearances as Spider-Man for Marvel. Bob Hoskins was considered for Doctor Octopus while Lauren Bacall and Katharine Hepburn were considered for Aunt May. Stan Lee expressed his desire to play J. Jonah Jameson in the film. The project was tentatively titled Spider-Man: The Movie and was budgeted between $15–20 million. Following the critical and financial failure of Superman IV: The Quest for Peace and Masters of the Universe which were produced by Cannon, the budget for Spider-Man: The Movie was cut to $7 million. Joseph Zito was unwilling to compromise and stepped down as director. He was replaced by Albert Pyun who was willing to make the film at a lower budget. The project was cancelled following Cannon's acquisition by Pathé and Golan's departure from the studio.

Golan extended his option on Spider-Man during his tenure as CEO of 21st Century Film Corporation. By 1989, Golan attempted to revive the project using the original script, budget, and storyboards developed at Cannon. In order to receive production funds, Golan sold the television rights to Viacom, home video rights to Columbia Pictures, and theatrical rights to Carolco Pictures where James Cameron became attached to write and direct the film. Cameron had previously met with Stan Lee to discuss a possible X-Men film until Lee convinced Cameron that he would be a good choice to direct a Spider-Man film. Cameron said superheroes were always fanciful to him. James Cameron submitted a treatment to Carolco in 1993, which served as a darker, more mature take on the character's mythos. In addition to featuring Spider-Man's origin story, it also included reimagined versions of the villains Electro and Sandman; the former was portrayed as a megalomaniacal businessman named Carlton Strand, while the latter was written as Strand's personal bodyguard named Boyd. Cameron's treatment also featured heavy profanity, and a sex scene between Spider-Man and Mary Jane Watson atop the Brooklyn Bridge. Carolco set a $50 million budget for Spider-Man, but progress stalled when Golan sued Carolco for attempting to make the film without his involvement. Cameron had recently completed True Lies for 20th Century Fox as part of a production deal with the studio. Fox attempted to acquire the film rights to Spider-Man for Cameron but this proved unsuccessful. At this point, James Cameron had abandoned the project and began work on Titanic. He would reveal in a 1997 interview on The Howard Stern Show that he had Titanic star Leonardo DiCaprio in mind for the lead role. Charlie Sheen and Edward Furlong were also in consideration for Cameron's Spider-Man. In 1995, Metro-Goldwyn-Mayer (MGM) acquired 21st Century Film Corporation which had given them access to the previous Spider-Man scripts. MGM then sued Viacom, Sony Pictures, and Marvel, who they accused of fraud in the original deal with Cannon. The following year, 21st Century, Carolco, and Marvel would all file for bankruptcy.

No film studio showed interest in a Spider-Man movie following the disastrous reception of Batman & Robin in 1997, which made film studios to not take the superhero genre seriously and have the perception that "comic books were for kids". However, the release of Blade by New Line Cinema in 1998 and the development of X-Men by 20th Century Fox convinced some studios that a Marvel character "could carry on" a movie. Marvel would emerge from bankruptcy in 1998 and declare that Menahem Golan's option had expired and that the rights had reverted to them. Marvel would then sell the film rights to Sony Pictures Entertainment, Columbia Pictures' parent company for $7 million. The deal came to effect in March 1999.

While John Calley was in work, training at Columbia, he sought with Kevin McClory's claim to develop an unofficial James Bond movie franchise, partially based on the material used on Thunderball, and also had the rights to the novel Casino Royale. MGM and Danjaq also had to sue Sony Pictures and Spectre Associates, regarding claims of how the McClory film with Sony has been demonstrated. The final blow came in March 1999, when Sony traded the Casino Royale film rights to MGM for the company's own Spider-Man project, thus starting right to production.

In April 1999, although Sony Pictures optioned from MGM all preceding script versions of a Spider-Man film, it only exercised the options on "the Cameron material", which contractually included a multi-author screenplay and a forty-five-page "scriptment" credited only to James Cameron. The studio announced they were not hiring Cameron himself to direct the film nor would they be using his script. The studio lined up Roland Emmerich, Tony Scott, Chris Columbus, Barry Sonnenfeld, Tim Burton, Michael Bay, Ang Lee, David Fincher, Jan de Bont and M. Night Shyamalan as potential directors. However, most of the directors approached were less interested in the job than in the story itself. Fincher did not want to depict the origin story, pitching the film as being based on The Night Gwen Stacy Died storyline, but the studio disagreed. Columbus would later pass on the project to direct Harry Potter and the Sorcerer's Stone instead. Burton expressed a lack of interest by remarking that he was "just A DC guy", given his past work in Batman and Batman Returns. Amy Pascal's choice for director was Sam Raimi. Raimi was attached to direct in January 2000, for a summer 2001 release. He had been a fan of the comic book during his youth, and his passion for Spider-Man earned him the job. Raimi's agent Josh Donen warned him that he was not Sony's preferred choice for the job, leading Raimi to cite all his reasons for which he would be the ideal director for the project during a meeting with Pascal, producer Laura Ziskin, Calley, Marvel Studios chief Avi Arad and film executive Matt Tolmach before abruptly ending his pitch after one hour, not wanting to overstay if Sony's executives did not want him.

Cameron's work became the basis of David Koepp's first draft screenplay, often word for word. Koepp said that Cameron's script was "influential". Koepp pitched the idea of having Peter Parker not getting his Spider-Man suit until after the film's first forty five minutes so they could stretch out the origin story and that Peter and Mary Jane would not get together at the end, feeling that them ending apart was romantic. Cameron's versions of the Marvel villains Electro and Sandman remained the antagonists. Koepp's rewrite substituted the Green Goblin as the main antagonist and added Doctor Octopus as the secondary antagonist. Raimi felt the Green Goblin and the surrogate father-son theme between Norman Osborn and Peter Parker would be more interesting, thus, he dropped Doctor Octopus from the film. In June, Columbia hired Scott Rosenberg to rewrite Koepp's material. Remaining a constant in all the rewrites was the "organic webshooter" idea from the Cameron "scriptment". Raimi felt he would stretch the audience's suspension of disbelief too far to have Parker invent mechanical webshooters.

Rosenberg removed Doctor Octopus and created several new action sequences. Raimi felt adding a third origin story would make the film too complex. Sequences removed from the final film had Spider-Man protecting Maximilian Fargas, the wheelchair-using Oscorp executive, from the Goblin, and Spider-Man defusing a hostage situation on a train. As production neared, Ziskin hired award-winning writer Alvin Sargent, to polish the dialogue, primarily between Parker and Mary Jane. Columbia gave the Writers Guild of America a list of four writers as contributors to the final Spider-Man script: Rosenberg, Sargent and James Cameron, all three of whom voluntarily relinquished credit to the fourth, Koepp.

Casting
For the titular role, the filmmakers wanted someone who was not "extraordinarily tall or handsome as Christopher Reeve", but who could have the "heart and soul" for the audience to identify with. The studio had expressed interest in actors Leonardo DiCaprio, Freddie Prinze Jr., Chris O'Donnell, Jude Law, Chris Klein, Ewan McGregor, Wes Bentley, and Heath Ledger. DiCaprio had been considered by James Cameron for the role in 1995, while Raimi joked that Prinze "won't even be allowed to buy a ticket to see this film". Sony made overtures to Law about Spider-Man. Pascal and her fellow executives pursued Ledger for the role due to her past collaborations, whereas Raimi met with Bentley but did not meet with DiCaprio or Ledger. Bentley turned down the role as he was uninterested doing Superhero movies. In addition, actors Scott Speedman, Jay Rodan and James Franco were involved in screen tests for the lead role (Franco would ultimately land the role of Harry Osborn). Joe Manganiello also auditioned for the role. He would eventually win the role as Parker's bully, Eugene "Flash" Thompson. Tobey Maguire was cast as Peter Parker/Spider-Man in July 2000, having been Sam Raimi's primary choice for the role after he saw The Cider House Rules. The studio was initially hesitant to cast someone who did not seem to fit the ranks of "adrenaline-pumping, tail-kicking titans", but Maguire managed to impress studio executives with his audition. The actor was signed for a deal in the range of $3 to $4 million with higher salary options for two sequels. To prepare, Maguire was trained by a physical trainer, a yoga instructor, a martial arts expert, and a climbing expert, taking several months to improve his physique. Maguire studied spiders and worked with a wire man to simulate the arachnid-like motion and had a special diet, though he tried to be as fit as possible due to being a vegan.

Nicolas Cage, Jason Isaacs and John Malkovich were considered for the role of Norman Osborn/Green Goblin, but turned down the role. Willem Dafoe was cast as Norman Osborn/Green Goblin in November 2000. Raimi met with Dafoe while he was filming a movie in Spain. He felt attracted at the prospect of working with Raimi and the idea of making a comic book movie. Dafoe insisted on wearing the uncomfortable costume as he felt that a stuntman would not convey the character's necessary body language. The 580-piece suit took half an hour to put on.

Kate Bosworth unsuccessfully auditioned for the role of Mary Jane Watson. Elizabeth Banks also auditioned for the role but she was told by Producer Laura Ziskin that she was too old for the role and was cast as Betty Brant instead. Kate Hudson turned down the role. Eliza Dushku, Mena Suvari and Jaime King also auditioned for the role. Before Raimi cast Dunst, he had expressed his interest in casting Alicia Witt. Dunst decided to audition after learning Maguire had been cast, feeling the film would have a more independent feel. Dunst earned the role a month before shooting in an audition in Berlin. Her hair was dyed in the front and she wore a half-wig. The crew wanted her to straighten her teeth but she refused.

J.K. Simmons was cast as J. Jonah Jameson, though he learned about his casting through a Spider-Man fan who had read the news of his casting at a fan website three hours before his agent contacted him to inform him that he had gotten the role. Despite Stan Lee's longtime interest in playing Jameson, the filmmakers agreed that he was too old to convincingly play the part, but Lee was supportive of Simmons' casting, feeling that Simmons did better than what he would have done.

Hugh Jackman, who starred as Logan / Wolverine in the X-Men film series, stated in September 2013 that he was approached to appear as Wolverine in the film in either a gag or just for a cameo appearance. However, when Jackman arrived to New York to shoot the scene, plans for his appearance never materialized because the filmmakers were unable to get the costume Jackman had used in X-Men.

Filming
With Spider-Man cast, filming was set to begin November 2000 in New York City and on Sony soundstages. The film was set for release in November 2001, but was postponed to be released on May 3, 2002 due to an expected extended post-production schedule.

Principal photography officially began on January 8, 2001, in Culver City, California. After the September 11 attacks happened that year, certain sequences were re-filmed, and certain images of the Twin Towers were digitally erased from the film. Sony's Stage 29 was used for Parker's Forest Hills home, and Stage 27 was used for the wrestling sequence where Parker takes on Bonesaw McGraw (Randy Savage). Stage 27 was also used for the complex Times Square sequence where Spider-Man and the Goblin battle for the first time, where a three-story set with a breakaway balcony piece was built. The scene also required shooting in Downey, California. On March 6, 45-year-old construction worker Tim Holcombe was killed when a forklift modified as a construction crane crashed into a construction basket that he was in. The following court case led to the California Division of Occupational Safety and Health to fine Sony $58,805. Raimi rented out a Warner Bros. Studio lot for the set to use to film the upside down kiss scene. Kirsten Dunst said that filming the upside down kiss scene was not so romantic, she said that Maguire could not breathe as water was pouring down into his nose while hanging upside down. Dunst also called shooting the scene "awful". Maguire also said that he was gasping for air. He and Franco had tension on set due to Franco's infatuation with Dunst, who was dating Maguire at the time. Randy Savage refused a Stunt Double to do a mid-flip so Savage did the stunt and injured himself.

In Los Angeles, locations included the Natural History Museum (for the Columbia University lab where Parker is bitten and receives his powers), the Pacific Electricity Building (the Daily Bugle offices) and Greystone Mansion (for the interiors of Norman Osborn's home), the latter of which was the set that was used for Batman. In April, 4 of the Spider-Man costumes were stolen, and Sony put up a $25,000 reward for their return. They were recovered after 18 months and a former movie studio security guard and an accomplice were arrested. Production moved to New York City for two weeks, taking in locations such as the Queensboro Bridge, the exteriors of Columbia University's Low Memorial Library and the New York Public Library, and a rooftop garden in the Rockefeller Center. The crew returned to Los Angeles where production continued, filming wrapped in June 2001. The Flatiron Building was used for the Daily Bugle.

Design

The Green Goblin's original headgear was an animatronic mask created by Amalgamated Dynamics. Dafoe described it as a "Halloween mask" and "kind of silly-looking", and the designers instead came up with a modern, angular helmet. Dafoe also wanted the costume to be flexible enough to allow him to do splits.

To create Spider-Man's costume, Maguire was fitted for the skintight suit, being covered with layers of substance to create the suit's shape. One concept costume designer James Acheson became fond of was the idea of having a red emblem over a black costume. Another, which would eventually lead to the final product, featured an enlarged logo on the chest and red stripes going down the sides of the legs. In early development, Acheson experimented with a potential helmet-like design for the suit, which was then scrapped. It was designed as a single piece, including the mask. A hard shell was worn underneath the mask to make the shape of the head look better and to keep the mask tight while keeping the wearer comfortable. For scenes in which Spider-Man would take his mask off, there was an alternate suit where the mask was a separate piece. The webbing, which accented the costume, was cut by computer. The mask eye lenses were designed to have a mirror look.

Visual effects
Visual effects supervisor John Dykstra was hired to produce the film's visual effects in May 2000. Dykstra met with Raimi while he was filming The Gift (2000). He convinced Raimi to make many of the stunts computer-generated imagery, as they would have been physically impossible. Raimi had used more traditional special effects in his previous films and learned a lot about using computers during production. Raimi worked hard to plan all the sequences of Spider-Man swinging from buildings, which he described as, "ballet in the sky." The complexity of such sequences meant the budget rose from an initially planned $70 million to around $100 million. Shots were made more complicated because of the main characters' individual color schemes, so Spider-Man and the Green Goblin had to be shot separately for effects shots: Spider-Man was shot in front of a greenscreen, while the Green Goblin was shot against bluescreen. Shooting them together would have resulted in one character being erased from a shot.

Dykstra said the biggest difficulty of creating Spider-Man was that as the character was masked, it immediately lost a lot of characterization. Without the context of eyes or mouth, a lot of body language had to be put in so that there would be emotional content. Raimi wanted to convey the essence of Spider-Man as being, "the transition that occurs between him being a young man going through puberty and being a superhero." Dykstra said his crew of animators had never reached such a level of sophistication to give subtle hints of still making Spider-Man feel like a human being. When two studio executives were shown shots of the computer generated character, they believed it was actually Maguire performing stunts. In addition, Dykstra's crew had to composite areas of New York City and replaced every car in shots with digital models. Raimi did not want it to feel entirely like animation, so none of the shots were 100% computer-generated.

Music

Danny Elfman composed the music for the film. Its soundtrack combines traditional orchestration, ethnic percussion, and electronic elements. Its distinct ethnic characteristics are credited to Elfman, who spent a year in Africa studying its unique percussion.

Release

Marketing

After the terrorist attacks in the United States on September 11, 2001, Sony recalled teaser posters which showed a close-up of Spider-Man's head with the New York skyline (including, prominently, the World Trade Center towers) reflected in his eyes. The film's original teaser trailer, released that same year, featured a mini-film plot involving a group of bank robbers escaping in a Eurocopter AS355 Twin Squirrel helicopter, which gets caught from behind and propelled backward into what at first appears to be a net, then is shown to be a gigantic spider web spun between the World Trade Center towers. This trailer was attached to the screenings of Jurassic Park III, American Pie 2, Rush Hour 2, Final Fantasy: The Spirits Within, Planet of the Apes, and other films. According to Sony, the trailer did not contain any actual footage from the film itself. Both the trailer and poster were removed after the events of the attacks, but can be found online. New teaser posters featuring Spider-Man and the Green Goblin were unveiled in November 2001. Meanwhile, a new trailer deemed acceptable by Sony was later released during Temptation Island and online on December 13, 2001. It made its theatrical debut six days later with the opening of The Lord of the Rings: The Fellowship of the Ring. Raimi later stated that the scene was, in fact, originally in the film but removed due to the recency of the attacks. Another Spider-Man trailer premiered online on March 27, 2002 and in theaters with the releases of Panic Room and The Rookie just two days later on March 29.

To promote the release of the film, Sony partnered with CKE Restaurants to release kids meal toys at Hardee's and Carl's Jr. restaurants. Beginning in April 2002, the locations offered customers three different Spider-Man collector's cups and patrons could purchase a Spider-Man figure to attach to their car radio antenna. A month later in May, "Cool Combos for Kids" would feature one of four different toys highlighting Spider-Man or his nemesis, the Green Goblin. KFC would then follow suit, releasing their own Spider-Man kids meal toys at their locations in the United Kingdom. Other promotional partners included Dr Pepper, Hershey's, Kellogg's, and Reebok.

Theatrical
In the U.S., the film was almost given an "R" rating by the MPAA due to the intensity of the final fight between Spider-Man and the Green Goblin, thus leading to the scene being toned down slightly. Ultimately, it was rated "PG-13" for "stylized violence and action". Before the film's British theatrical release in June 2002, the British Board of Film Classification (BBFC) gave the film a "12" certificate. Due to Spider-Mans popularity with younger children, this prompted much controversy. The BBFC defended its decision, arguing that the film could have been given a "15". Despite this, North Norfolk and Breckland District Councils, in East Anglia, changed it to a "PG", and Tameside council, Manchester, denoted it a "PG-12". In late August, the BBFC relaxed its policy to "12A", leading Sony to re-release the film.

Home media
Spider-Man was released on DVD and VHS on November 1, 2002 in North America and Australia, and on November 25, 2002 in the UK. Over 7 million DVD copies were sold on the first day of release. The film would hold the record for having the highest single-day DVD sales until it was taken by Finding Nemo in 2003. As of 2022, it has the single-day record for any live-action film. In just a few days, the DVD release sold more than 11 million copies, beating Monsters, Inc. and setting records for any DVD release. While the VHS release sold over 6.5 million copies, the DVD release went on to become one of the best-selling live-action DVD titles of all time with over 19.5 million copies being sold. This two-disc DVD release comes in widescreen (1.85:1 aspect ratio) and fullscreen (specifically reframed 1.33:1 aspect ratio digitally mastered from the original source and specially reframed by the filmmakers themselves without gutting out portions of the frame using pan and scan) versions. Bonus features on the first disc include commentaries, character files, marketing champaign with music videos, TV spots and trailers, Weaving the Web Pop-Up Factoids, the Spider-Sense option that pops up an icon of Spider-Man while disabling subtitles and more. As for the second disc, the special features are an HBO special called The Making of Spider-Man, The Evolution of Spider-Man, outtakes, screen tests, an E! Network special called Spider-Mania and more. Both discs feature DVD-ROM features, such as a countdown to Spider-Man 2, record your own commentary and an Activision game.

The film's American television rights (Fox, TBS/TNT) were sold for $60 million. Related gross toy sales were $109 million. Its American DVD revenue by July 2004 was $338.8 million. Its American VHS revenue by July 2004 was $89.2 million.

In the United Kingdom, the film was watched by 700,000 viewers on subscription television channel Sky Movies 1 in 2004, making it the year's ninth most-watched film on subscription television.

The film made its Blu-ray debut in 2007 as part of the Spider-Man Trilogy. Just three years later, it was released as a separate Blu-ray on November 16, 2010. This was followed by another release on July 5, 2011. Spider-Man was also included in the Spider-Man Legacy Collection, which includes 5 Spider-Man films in a 4K UHD Blu-ray collection, which was released on October 17, 2017.

Reception

Box office
Spider-Man became the first film to pass the $100 million mark in a single weekend, even when adjusting for inflation, with its $114,844,116 gross establishing a new opening weekend record. The gross surpassed the previous record holder's Harry Potter and the Sorcerer's Stone $90.3 million opening; on this, Rick Lyman of The New York Times wrote "while industry executives had expected a strong opening for the film because there was little competition in the marketplace and prerelease polling indicated intense interest from all age groups, no one predicted that Spider-Man would surpass the Harry Potter record." Starting with Twister in 1996, the benefits of bowing in May had been first fully exploited with its $41 million opening weekend. Following comparable debuts of Deep Impact in 1998 and The Mummy in 1999, the frame was taken to the next level in 2001 with the release of The Mummy Returns. Spider-Man had not only made history for a summer starter film, but for weekends as well. It surpassed The Lost World: Jurassic Park for having the largest May opening weekend. When the film was released, it was ranked number one at the box office, beating The Scorpion King. The film also broke X-Mens record for having the highest opening weekend for a superhero film.

The film also set a record for crossing the $100 million milestone in three days, at the time being the fastest any film had reached the mark. This opening weekend haul had an average of $31,769 per theater, which at the time, Box Office Mojo reported as being "the highest per theater average ever for an ultra-wide release." The film's three-day record was surpassed by Pirates of the Caribbean: Dead Man's Chest four years later. The $114.8 million opening weekend was the highest at the North America box office film for a non-sequel, until it was surpassed eight years later by Alice in Wonderland. Spider-Man would hold the record for having the highest-three day gross until it was surpassed by Star Wars: Episode III – Revenge of the Sith in 2005. Within four days, it had the biggest non-holiday Monday of all time with $11 million, increasing the total gross to $125.1 million and staying ahead of recent blockbusters, including Charlie's Angels and Erin Brockovich.

With the release in the United States and Canada on May 3, 2002, on 7,500 screens at 3,615 theaters, the film earned $39,406,872 on its opening day, averaging $10,901 per theater. This was the highest opening day at the time until it was surpassed by its sequel Spider-Man 2s $40.4 million haul in 2004. For three years, the film would hold the record for having the highest Friday gross until 2005 when it was overtaken by Harry Potter and the Goblet of Fire. Upon its opening, it had the third-highest number of screenings of any film, behind Harry Potter and the Sorcerer's Stone and Mission: Impossible 2. Spider-Man also set an all-time record for the highest earnings in a single day with $43,622,264 on its second day of release, a record later surpassed by Shrek 2 in 2004. On the Sunday during its opening weekend, the film earned an additional $31,814,980, the highest gross a film took in on a Sunday, at the time.

The film stayed at the top position in its second weekend ahead of Unfaithful, dropping only 38% and grossing another $71,417,527, while averaging $19,755.89 per theater. At the time, this was the highest-grossing second weekend of any film. During its second weekend, the film reached the $200 million mark on its ninth day of release, also a record at the time. This made it the fastest film to cross the $200 million mark, surpassing Star Wars: Episode I – The Phantom Menace. At the end of its second weekend, the film brought in a 10-day total of $223,040,031. It quickly surpassed Ice Age to become the highest-grossing film of the year. Spider-Man had crossed over 149 spots on the top-grossing film chart, landing in 29th place between Rush Hour 2 and Mrs. Doubtfire while excelling past the final tallies of other films, including Batman Forever, Mission: Impossible 2 and The Mummy Returns.

The film dropped to the second position in its third weekend, behind Star Wars: Episode II – Attack of the Clones, but still made $45,036,912, dropping only 37%, averaging $12,458 per theater, and bringing the 17-day tally to $285,573,668. Its third weekend haul set the record for highest-grossing third weekend, which was first surpassed by Avatar (2009). Spider-Man would beat another record that was previously held by The Phantom Menace, becoming the quickest film to hit $300 million in just 22 days. It stayed at the second position in its fourth weekend, grossing $35,814,844 over the four-day Memorial Day frame, dropping only 21% while expanding to 3,876 theaters, averaging $9,240 over four days, and bringing the 25-day gross to $333,641,492. Within 66 days, it was the fastest film to approach $400 million, tying its record with Titanic. Both films held this record for two years before being surpassed by Shrek 2.

At the box office, Spider-Man became 2002's highest-grossing film with $407,022,860 in the U.S. and Canada, defeating The Lord of the Rings: The Two Towers and Attack of the Clones. As of 2021, Spider-Man ranks as the 37th-highest-grossing film of all time in the U.S. and Canada, not adjusted for inflation. The film also grossed $418,002,176 from its international markets, bringing its worldwide total to $825,025,036 making it 2002's third-highest-grossing film behind The Two Towers and Harry Potter and the Chamber of Secrets and the 58th-highest-grossing film of all time, worldwide. Additionally, it was the highest-grossing Sony film of all time, beating out Men in Black. Spider-Man also dethroned Batmans record for becoming the highest-grossing superhero film of all time. The film sold an estimated 69,484,700 tickets in the US. It held the record for most tickets sold by a comic book movie until The Dark Knight topped it in 2008. As of 2020, it is still the sixth highest grossing comic book movie of all time adjusted for inflation. Only Avengers: Infinity War, The Dark Knight, Black Panther, The Avengers and Avengers: Endgame have sold more tickets than Spider-Man. Spider-Man was the highest-grossing superhero origin film, a record it held for 15 years until it was surpassed by Wonder Woman (2017). As of 2020, it is the 12th-highest-grossing superhero film, as well as the 12th-highest-grossing comic book adaptation in general.

Internationally, Spider-Man opened in 17 territories in its first week, earning a total of $13.3 million. It scored the second-highest opening in Iceland, Singapore and South Korea. Plus, Russia and Yugoslavia had the third best all time film opening. Spider-Man would score the biggest opening in Switzerland with $1.4 million and 160,000 admissions from 106 screens, surpassing The World Is Not Enough. As for Germany, it had the strongest June opening and the third best debut of any movie, behind Attack of the Clones and Ice Age. Its opening screenings in France were a massive 10,645 admissions from 27 screens, beating out the French film Asterix & Obelix: Mission Cleopatra. Additionally, it set the highest opening gross in Spain. Meanwhile, Spider-Man would go on to unleash new opening records in the UK during the 2002 FIFA World Cup soccer game. The film made $13.9 million from 509 screens, making it the country's fifth biggest movie opening, trailing only behind Harry Potter and the Sorcerer's Stone, The Phantom Menace, The Lord of the Rings: The Fellowship of the Ring and Attack of the Clones. In addition, Spider-Man had the largest opening of any film in the UK with a BBFC certificate higher than a "PG" rating, staying ahead of Independence Day and Hannibal. Despite lunch matches, it still led the weekend box office to a bigger 110% week-to-week increase and a 130% year-on-year increase when Pearl Harbor led the chart during its third week. It was the country's number one film for three weeks until it was displaced by Minority Report. In India, the film was simultaneously released in English and three different languages across 250 screens, becoming the widest reach and return for a Hollywood title since The Mummy Returns in 2001. It was even Sony's first major release in the country since Godzilla in 1998. The total number of international markets that generated grosses in excess of $10 million include Australia ($16.9 million), Brazil ($17.4 million), France, Algeria, Monaco, Morocco and Tunisia ($32.9 million), Germany ($30.7 million), Italy ($20.8 million), Japan ($56.2 million), Mexico ($31.2 million), South Korea ($16.98 million), Spain ($23.7 million), and the United Kingdom, Ireland and Malta ($45.8 million).

Spider-Man became the highest-grossing superhero film of all time at the time of its release, both domestically and worldwide while surpassing Batman. Its domestic gross was eventually topped by The Dark Knight (2008). Its worldwide gross was first surpassed by Spider-Man 3 (2007).

The film also held the record as Sony's highest-grossing film domestically until 2018, when it was finally surpassed by Jumanji: Welcome to the Jungle ($404.5 million).

Critical response
The website's critics consensus reads, "Not only does Spider-Man provide a good dose of web-swinging fun, it also has a heart, thanks to the combined charms of director Sam Raimi and star Tobey Maguire." Metacritic, which uses a weighted average, has assigned the film a score of 73 out of 100 based on 38 critics, indicating "generally favorable reviews". Audiences polled by CinemaScore gave the film an average grade of "A−" on an A+ to F scale.

The casting, mainly Tobey Maguire, Willem Dafoe and J. K. Simmons, is often cited as one of the film's high points. Eric Harrison, of the Houston Chronicle, was initially skeptical of the casting of Maguire, but after seeing the film he stated, "it becomes difficult to imagine anyone else in the role." USA Today critic Mike Clark believed the casting rivaled that of Christopher Reeve as 1978's Superman. Owen Gleiberman, of Entertainment Weekly, had mixed feelings about the casting, particularly Tobey Maguire. "Maguire, winning as he is, never quite gets the chance to bring the two sides of Spidey—the boy and the man, the romantic and the avenger—together." The Hollywood Reporters Kirk Honeycutt thought: "the filmmakers' imaginations work in overdrive from the clever design of the cobwebby opening credits and Spider-Man and M.J.'s upside down kiss—after one of his many rescues of her—to a finale that leaves character relationships open ended for future adventures."

LA Weekly Manohla Dargis wrote, "It isn't that Spider-Man is inherently unsuited for live-action translation; it's just that he's not particularly interesting or, well, animated." Giving it two and a half stars out of four, Roger Ebert of the Chicago Sun-Times felt that the film lacked a decent action element: "Consider the scene where Spider-Man is given a cruel choice between saving Mary Jane or a cable car full of school kids. He tries to save both, so that everyone dangles from webbing that seems about to pull loose. The visuals here could have given an impression of the enormous weights and tensions involved, but instead the scene seems more like a bloodless storyboard of the idea."
Stylistically, there was heavy criticism of the Green Goblin's costume, which led IGN's Richard George to comment years later: "We're not saying the comic book costume is exactly thrilling, but the Goblin armor (the helmet in particular) from Spider-Man is almost comically bad... Not only is it not frightening, it prohibits expression."

Entertainment Weekly put "the kiss in Spider-Man" on its end-of-the-decade "best-of" list, saying: "There's a fine line between romantic and corny. And the rain-soaked smooch between Spider-Man and Mary Jane from 2002 tap-dances right on that line. The reason it works? Even if she suspects he's Peter Parker, she doesn't try to find out. And that's sexy."

Empire magazine ranked Spider-Man 437 in its 500 Greatest Movies of All Time list in 2008.

Accolades

The film won several awards ranging from Teen Choice Awards to the Saturn Awards, and was also nominated for two Academy Awards for Best Visual Effects and Best Sound (Kevin O'Connell, Greg P. Russell and Ed Novick), but lost to The Lord of the Rings: The Two Towers and Chicago, respectively. While only Danny Elfman brought home a Saturn Award, Raimi, Maguire, and Dunst were all nominated for their respective positions. It also took home the People's Choice Award for "Favorite Motion Picture." The film was nominated for Favorite Movie at the Nickelodeon Kids' Choice Awards, but lost to Austin Powers in Goldmember.

Future

Sequels 

Two sequels to Spider-Man were produced and directed by Sam Raimi: Spider-Man 2 was released on June 30, 2004, while Spider-Man 3 was released on May 4, 2007.

Animated television series
A CGI/spin-off animated series, Spider-Man: The New Animated Series, ran on July to September 2003; it was intended to be the continuation of the first film, and was an alternate sequel to the film unrelated to the events of the later sequels.

Video game

A video game based on the film of the same name was released. The game was developed by Treyarch (only for the home consoles) and published by Activision, and released in 2002 for Game Boy Advance, GameCube, Microsoft Windows, PlayStation 2, and Xbox. The game has many scenes and villains that did not appear in the film. It was followed by Spider-Man 2 two years later to promote the release of the second film. In 2007, to promote the release of the third film, Spider-Man 3 was released. Tobey Maguire and Willem Dafoe were the only actors who reprised their roles from the film. Spider-Man: Friend or Foe was released in 2007, the games borrow the film characters, and it serves as non-canon plot of the film series.

The critical reviews for the game were positive. By July 2006, the PlayStation 2 version of Spider-Man had sold 2.1 million copies and earned $74 million in the United States. Next Generation ranked it as the 15th highest-selling game launched for the PlayStation 2, Xbox or GameCube between January 2000 and July 2006 in that country. Combined sales of Spider-Man console games released in the 2000s reached 6 million units in the United States by July 2006.

References

External links

 
 
  
 

2002 films
2000s English-language films
2000s coming-of-age films
2002 science fiction action films
2000s superhero films
2000s American films
American science fiction action films
American coming-of-age films
Films set in New York City
Films set in Columbia University
Films shot in Los Angeles
Films shot in New York City
Impact of the September 11 attacks on cinema
Advertising and marketing controversies in film
Spider-Man films
Teen superhero drama films
Columbia Pictures films
Films scored by Danny Elfman
Films directed by Sam Raimi
Films with screenplays by David Koepp
Film and television memes
Internet memes
Internet memes introduced in 2002
Spider-Man (2002 film series)
Green Goblin
American vigilante films
Films produced by Ian Bryce
Films about father–son relationships
Live-action films based on Marvel Comics